Pultenaea villosa, commonly known as hairy bush-pea, is a species of flowering plant in the family Fabaceae and is endemic to eastern Australia. It is a shrub with softly-hairy foliage, narrow elliptic to linear, oblong to club-shaped leaves, and yellow-orange and reddish-brown, pea-like flowers.

Description

Taxonomy
Pultenaea villosa was first formally described in 1799 by Carl Ludwig Willdenow in the fourth edition of the Species Plantarum. The specific epithet (villosa) means "with long, soft hairs".

Distribution and habitat
Hairy bush-pea grows in forest, heathland grassland and coastal dunes in south-east Queensland and on the coast and Northern Tablelands of New South Wales.

Use in horticulture
This "eggs and bacon" pea is one of the easier pultenaeas to grow in the garden. It can be propagated from seed or from cuttings and grown as a specimen plant or in informal hedges, preferring moist soil in a partly sunny position. The species is frost hardy and has "attractive" reddish new growth.

References

Fabales of Australia
Flora of New South Wales
Flora of Queensland
villosa
Plants described in 1799
Taxa named by Carl Ludwig Willdenow